Self-made or Self Made or Selfmade may refer to:
Self-made man
Selfmade Records, a German hip hop label
Self Made (album), an album by Rocko
"Self-Made" (Law & Order: Criminal Intent), an episode of Law & Order: Criminal Intent
Self Made Vol. 1, a collaboration studio album from Maybach Music Group
Self Made (film), a 2014 film
"Self-Made" (song), a song by Bryson Tiller
Self Made (miniseries), a 2020 Netflix limited series about the life of Madame C. J. Walker

See also